Michael James Proly (born December 15, 1950) is a retired Major League Baseball pitcher who played from 1976 to 1983 for the St. Louis Cardinals, Chicago White Sox, Philadelphia Phillies, and Chicago Cubs.

Mike attended Chaminade High School and was selected by the St. Louis Cardinals in the 9th round (213th overall) of the 1972 MLB June Amateur Draft from St. John's University in Queens, NY.

See also
 Chicago White Sox all-time roster

External links

1950 births
Living people
St. Louis Cardinals players
Chicago White Sox players
Philadelphia Phillies players
Chicago Cubs players
St. Petersburg Cardinals players
Major League Baseball pitchers
St. John's Red Storm baseball players
Sportspeople from Queens, New York
Baseball players from New York City
Chaminade High School alumni
Arkansas Travelers players
Iowa Cubs players
Iowa Oaks players
Modesto Reds players
Syracuse Chiefs players
Tacoma Twins players
Tulsa Oilers (baseball) players
Sportspeople from Nassau County, New York